Spotted Horse is an unincorporated community in Campbell County, Wyoming, United States. Its current population is two. The town is on U.S. routes 14/16, at the head of Spotted Horse Creek, a tributary of the Powder River. The undeveloped Spotted Horse coalfield is north of town.

The town was named after a Native American. Its post office closed in 1964.

History
The Astorian expedition camped near the future Spotted Horse townsite in 1811.

A small community lived at the site in the 19th century. By about 1900 Solon and George Walker established a general store and post office. A.L. Pringle established the present bar as a store and gas station in the early 1920s. A school was established in the 1920s. A dance hall was destroyed in a 1944 tornado.

References

External links

Unincorporated communities in Campbell County, Wyoming
Unincorporated communities in Wyoming
Coal towns in Wyoming